is a Japanese footballer currently playing as a striker for Hokkaido Consadole Sapporo.

Career statistics

Club
.

Notes

References

External links

2002 births
Living people
Japanese footballers
Association football forwards
J1 League players
Hokkaido Consadole Sapporo players